Bashin': The Unpredictable Jimmy Smith is a 1962 studio album by the American jazz organist Jimmy Smith, accompanied by a big band arranged and conducted by Oliver Nelson. It was Smith's first album for Verve Records. The first four tracks feature an ensemble that included future Tonight Show band members Doc Severinsen and Ed Shaughnessy.

Track listing 
 "Walk on the Wild Side" (Elmer Bernstein, Mack David) – 5:55
 "Ol' Man River" (Oscar Hammerstein II, Jerome Kern) – 3:56
 "In a Mellow Tone" (Duke Ellington, Milt Gabler) – 4:25
 "Step Right Up" (Oliver Nelson) – 4:13
 "Beggar for the Blues" (Ray Rasch, Dotty Wayne) – 7:28
 "Bashin'" (Jimmy Smith) – 6:16
 "I'm an Old Cowhand (From the Rio Grande)" (Johnny Mercer) – 6:17

Personnel

Musicians
Tracks 1-4
 Jimmy Smith – organ
 Oliver Nelson – arranger, conductor
 Phil Woods, Jerry Dodgion – alto saxophone
 Bob Ashton, Babe Clarke – tenor saxophone
 George Barrow – baritone saxophone
 Joe Newman, Ernie Royal, Doc Severinsen, Joe Wilder – trumpet
 Jimmy Cleveland, Urbie Green, Britt Woodman – trombone
 Tom Mitchell – bass trombone
 Barry Galbraith – guitar
 George Duvivier – bass
 Ed Shaughnessy – drums

Tracks 5-7
 Jimmy Smith – organ
 Quentin Warren – guitar
 Donald Bailey – drums

Technical
 Creed Taylor – producer
 Rudy Van Gelder – engineer
 Del Shields – liner notes

Chart performance

Single

References

1962 albums
Jimmy Smith (musician) albums
Albums produced by Creed Taylor
Albums arranged by Oliver Nelson
Albums conducted by Oliver Nelson
Verve Records albums